Wolfgang Dessecker (18 August 1911 – 26 March 1973) was a German middle-distance runner. He competed in the men's 800 metres at the 1936 Summer Olympics.

References

External links
 

1911 births
1973 deaths
Athletes (track and field) at the 1936 Summer Olympics
German male middle-distance runners
Olympic athletes of Germany
Place of birth missing
Sportspeople from Stuttgart